The Ecuadorian ambassador in Beijing is the official representative of the Government in Quito to the government of the Peoples Republic of China.

List of representatives

References 

 
China
Ecuador